Hybrid Child is a one-shot Japanese manga written and illustrated by Shungiku Nakamura; the creator of Junjou Romantica. It is licensed in North America by Digital Manga Publishing, which released the manga through its imprint, June, on August 16, 2006. A drama CD was released by Marine Entertainment in 2005. An OVA adaptation of the manga was announced as being in development in 2011, and the first of four OVAs released in 2014.

Premise
The Hybrid Child is an amazing android that can grow if it is lavished with enough love and care from its owner. Neither fully machine nor fully human, the various Hybrid Child models develop strong emotional bonds with their owners. This volume contains several short stories of love, sacrifice, and drama: Young Kotaro learns the importance of responsibility when his Hybrid Child's lifespan runs out. The tragic swordsman Seya learns to love again with the help of his Hybrid child, Yuzu. The final tale tells the story of Kuroda, the creator of the Hybrid Child designs, and how his lost love inspired their creation.

Characters
 
 , Nobuhiko Okamoto, Megumi Iwasaki (childhood) (OVA)
 Kotarou Izumi is the 16th head of the Izumi household, which is the noblest household. When he was 8 years old, he found an abandoned Hybrid Child at the garbage dump and named it Hazuki. The Izumi family tried to dispose of Hazuki a total of 3 times, forcing him to buy a new one instead. Kotaro brought him home each time saying: "It has to be Hazuki." According to Hazuki, Kotaro is unreliable, although he is the heir of the family. He often fails exams and finds excuses to avoid studying. He also feels it is unjust that Hazuki grew up to be taller than he is.
 
 , Daisuke Hirakawa, Mahiru Konno (childhood) (OVA)
 Besides being Kotaro's Hybrid Child, Hazuki acts as his tutor and butler at the same time. He feels he might be spoiling Kotaro too much, but ultimately he wants to groom Kotaro into a proper family head. According to Kotaro, he gets irritated too easily. Despite his somewhat strict attitude, he can feel embarrassed as shown when Kotaro asks him to strip. He sports a black suit with a white Victorian tie underneath and has a function that regulates his body temperature, which allows him to withstand the hot summer weather, even though he wears the suit. Kuroda discovers that Hazuki is the Hybrid Child with the serial number 0001, which is the antique first model. His skin transformed almost into that of a human's, and his joints have disappeared. It is implied that Hazuki is the first Hybrid Child to have grown the furthest.
 
 , Tsubasa Yonaga (OVA)
 
 , Ryōhei Kimura, Haruka Kimura (childhood) (OVA)
 
 , Yoshitsugu Matsuoka, Nozomi Masu (childhood) (OVA)
 
 , Yūki Ono, Risa Hayamizu (childhood) (OVA)

References

External links
 Official Website
 
 June Manga site

Drama anime and manga
Josei manga
2005 manga
Science fiction anime and manga
Yaoi anime and manga
Japanese LGBT-related television shows
Studio Deen
Digital Manga Publishing titles